The Health and Care Act is an Act of the Parliament of the United Kingdom, which is intended to dismantle many of the structures established by the Health and Social Care Act 2012. Many of the proposals were drafted under the leadership of Simon Stevens and are intended to reinforce the ambitions of the NHS Long Term Plan.

It was introduced into the House of Commons in July 2021 and was the first substantial health legislation in the premiership of Boris Johnson. It was proposed to take effect in April 2022, but in December 2021 it was reported that implementation would be delayed until July 2022.

The Act

The Act puts integrated care systems on a statutory footing, and merges NHS England and NHS Improvement. It provides for the Care Quality Commission to assess how local authorities deliver their adult social care functions. The Department of Health and Social Care launched a consultation on a proposed new 'provider selection regime' in 2022. This took effect with the passing of the Act and effectively ends the NHS internal market as NHS commissioners will no longer be automatically obliged to put clinical services out to tender. It includes provisions which would give the Secretary of State for Health and Social Care more power to direct NHS agencies, including NHS England and Improvement, and over "notifiable" service changes, which will be defined in regulations. If ministers "call in" a reconfiguration proposal for review, they must make a final decision within six months. It establishes an integrated care board and an integrated care partnership in every part of England. Each board is required to have, as a minimum:
Four executives: the chief executive and finance, nursing and medical directors.
Three independent non-executives: a chair and at least two others. They "will normally not hold positions or offices in other health and care organisations within the ICS footprint".
Three "partner members": one from an NHS trust/foundation trust in the patch, one from general practice, and one from a local authority.

It allows NHS Digital to collect more information on medicines to analyse their use and safety and request information from private providers and makes it a criminal offence to share that data inappropriately.

It puts a £86,000 cap on the amount anyone in England will have to spend on their personal care over their lifetime. The Act criminalises "aiding and abetting" women to undergo hymenorrhaphy, or hymen reconstruction surgery, along with virginity testing. The government agreed three amendments in discussions in the House of Lords relating to mental health in February 2022: requiring the definition of 'health' to include mental health; to place a duty on new integrated care boards to have mental health expertise; and to require more transparency and accountability on mental health funding.

It is claimed that it will "dispose of unnecessary bureaucracy that has held the health service back", and will ensure the NHS is "more accountable to government". The Act also includes a target of the NHS achieving net zero carbon emissions by 2040.

Reception
Its social care provisions are criticized as insufficient, especially for failing to deal with the workforce crisis, and for leaving the  "cap on care costs far less fair and generous than originally expected. Poorer people with lower wealth will be hit hardest – and some will still face crippling social care costs,” according to the Health Foundation.

References

External links
Bill as introduced in the House of Commons

Health care reform
National Health Service (England)
United Kingdom Acts of Parliament 2022
NHS legislation
Climate change policy in the United Kingdom